is a Japanese retired high jumper. He competed at the 1997 World Championships without reaching the final. He was also the 1995 Japanese national champion.

Personal best

International competition

National title
Japanese Championships
High jump: 1995

References

External links

Michiya Onoue at Suzuki Track and Field Club  (archived)

1971 births
Living people
Sportspeople from Shizuoka Prefecture
Japanese male high jumpers
World Athletics Championships athletes for Japan
Competitors at the 1995 Summer Universiade
Japan Championships in Athletics winners
Nihon University alumni